The Gateway School District is a large, suburban, public school district located in Monroeville, Pennsylvania. It also serves residents of Pitcairn. Per the 2000 federal census data, the Gateway School District serves a resident population of 33,038. By 2010, the district's population was 31,686 people. In 2009, the District residents' per capita income was $22,998, while the median family income was $51,250. In the Commonwealth, the median family income was $49,501  and the United States median family income was $49,445, in 2010. By 2013, the median household income in the United States rose to $52,100.

Schools
All students in the district attend Gateway High School for 9th grade to 12th grade. Depending on the location of their home, students in kindergarten through grade four attend either: Evergreen Elementary School, Dr. Cleveland Steward, Jr. Elementary School, Ramsey Elementary School, or University Park Elementary School.

 Evergreen Elementary School - 3831 Evergreen Drive, Monroeville, PA 15146. Report Card 2010 
 Dr. Cleveland Steward, Jr. Elementary School- 5000 Gateway Campus Boulevard, Monroeville, PA  15146. Report Card 2010 
 Ramsey Elementary School - 2200 Ramsey Road, Monroeville, PA 15146. Report Card 2010 
 University Park Elementary School - 320 Noel Drive, Monroeville, PA  15146. Report Card 2010 
 Moss Side Middle School - Grades 5, 6, 7 & 8 (for 2022-2023 school year), 9000 Gateway Campus Boulevard, Monroeville, PA 15146. Report Card 2010 
 Gateway Middle School - Grades 5, 6, 7 & 8 (expected opening Fall 2023),  4450 Old William Penn Highway, Monroeville, PA 15146 Report Card 2010 
 Gateway High School - 3000 Gateway Campus Boulevard, Monroeville, PA 15146

Extracurriculars
The district offers a variety of clubs, activities and sports.

Athletics
The mascot of the school district is the Gateway Gator, a stylized alligator.

Gateway Middle School

Beginning in 7th grade, at Gateway Middle School, Gateway School District offers competitive play in several sports while representing the district and their specific school. While athletics conducted by the middle school are not WPIAL/PIAA recognized and therefore do not offer playoffs/championships, they do serve as the first introduction to competition on an interscholastic basis for many student-athletes, preparing them for high school competition where much more may be expected of them.

Gateway High School

Gateway High School is recognized as a member of the Pennsylvania Interscholastic Athletic Association (P.I.A.A.) on the state level. Within the PIAA, Gateway competes in the Western Pennsylvania Interscholastic Athletic League (W.P.I.A.L.), otherwise known as "District 7", on the regional level. On October 7, 2015, the PIAA voted to expand the classification system for football, basketball, baseball, and softball from four to six classifications. The vote for football passed by a 26–4 vote, while the vote for basketball, baseball, and softball passed by a 23–7 vote. All other sports still operate on the PIAA's original scale of four classifications. While most sports offered by the high school are competitive and recognized by the PIAA/WPIAL, some are noncompetitive and are not recognized by the PIAA/WPIAL, and others are combination of both.

Sports Offered/Classifications

Gateway High School offers a plethora of athletic programs. PIAA/WPIAL-recognized programs offered include cross country, football, golf, soccer, tennis, volleyball, basketball, swimming and diving, indoor track, track and field, wrestling, baseball, softball, volleyball, bowling, and lacrosse. Programs that are not PIAA/WPIAL-recognized include ice hockey and cheerleading, and therefore have no classification. Both of these programs are considered "clubs" and may or may not compete competitively while not being recognized as a school-supported sport. Per the aforementioned PIAA ruling, size classification for football, basketball, baseball, and softball sports is "AAAAA" (Five-A), which is the second largest of the six classifications (A, AA, AAA, AAAA, AAAAA, and AAAAAA).   With the exception of lacrosse, size classification for all other PIAA/WPIAL-recognized programs is "AAA" (Triple-A), which is the second largest of the four classifications (A, AA, AAA, and AAAA). Lacrosse is a relatively new athletics program at Gateway High School, with its inaugural season being in 2011. Since then, officials worked hard to push for it to become a PIAA/WPIAL-recognized sport after initially operating as a club, which they eventually achieved. The Gateway High School lacrosse program is in the "AA" size classification, which is the third largest of the four classifications (A, AA, AAA, and AAAA).

Clubs
Gateway High School offers many clubs for its students to join.

Gateway's Student Councils and Student Governments play a large role in student life. They are in charge of all school dances, fund-raisers, school spirit activities, and also attend and host various leadership workshops and conferences through the Pennsylvania Association of Student Councils.

Gateway also competes in the FIRST Robotics Competition, an annual event for high-school aged participants. Gateway's team, Quasics, is FRC Team #2656. They have competed annually at the Pittsburgh Regional since 2008.

Robotics
Mr. Chalus and Mr. Reese are the founding teachers of the Gateway Middle School Robotics club. Lego Mindstorms are used for robotic competitions by the robotics club at Gateway Middle School.

History
Before 1948, Monroeville students could choose to attend nearby schools on a tuition basis. In the mid-1950s, the districts joined and began making plans for a new senior high school. Official action began February 1956, breaking ground in January 1957.

The joint School Board selected the name of Gateway Senior High School. By September 1958, 900 students from Monroeville and Pitcairn were occupying the new high school. The first graduating class of 196 students received their diplomas in June 1959. For the next 25 years, grades 10-11-12 would attend school in the high school. 1983 marked the beginning of a new era at Gateway. Ninth grade was moved to the high school, South Junior High School became the Gateway Upper Elementary (5-6), and Monroeville Junior High School became Gateway Junior High School (7-8). Eleven years later, in 1994, Gateway Upper Elementary became the Moss Side Middle School (5-6), and Gateway Junior High School became Gateway Middle School (7-8).

In 2007, the district completed its reconstruction and expansion of the high school complex. This complex includes the Monroeville Public Library, Pete Antimarino Football Stadium, the high school, Moss Side Middle School, administration offices, and various other multi-use sports fields.

References

External links
Gateway School District Official Website
Gateway Athletics & Football Website
Gateway Alumni Website
Gateway Band Website

School districts established in 1958
School districts in Allegheny County, Pennsylvania
Education in Pittsburgh area
1958 establishments in Pennsylvania